Shivakumara Swami (born Shivanna; 1 April 1907 – 21 January 2019) was an Indian humanitarian, spiritual leader, educator and supercentenarian. He was a Veerashaiva 
Lingayat religious figure.  Swami joined the Siddaganga Matha in 1930 Karnataka and became head seer in 1941. He also founded the Sri Siddaganga Education Society. Described as the most esteemed adherent of Lingayatism (Veerashaivism), he was referred to as Nadedaaduva Devaru (walking God) in the state.  In 2015, Swami was awarded by the Government of India the Padma Bhushan, India's third highest civilian award.

Early life
Shivanna was born on 1 April 1907 in Veerapura, a village near Magadi in the former Kingdom of Mysore (in present-day Ramanagara district of Karnataka state) in a Lingayat Gowda family. He was the youngest of thirteen children of Gangamma and Honne Gowda. Having been devoted followers of the deities Gangadhareshwara and Honnadevi, Shivanna's parents took him to the shrines in Shivagange, and other religious centres around Veerapura. His mother Gangamma died when he was eight.

Shivanna completed his elementary education in a rural Anglo-vernacular school in Nagavalli, a village in the present-day Tumkur district. He graduated in 1926. He was also briefly a resident-student at the Siddaganga Matha during this time. He enrolled in Central College of Bangalore to study in arts with physics and mathematics as optional subjects. Shivanna was proficient in the Kannada, Sanskrit and English languages.

Shivanna ended his attendance at college before earning a bachelor's degree because he had been named successor to Uddana Shivayogi Swami as head of the Siddaganga Matha. Shivanna's friend and the heir to head the Matha, Sri Marularadhya, died on 16 January 1930.  The incumbent chief Shivayogi Swami chose Shivanna to take Sri Marularadhya's place as heir.  Upon formal initiation, Shivanna, renamed Shivakumara, entered the viraktashram (the monks' order) on 3 March 1930.  He assumed the pontifical name Shivakumara Swami. Following Shivayogi Swami's death on 11 January 1941, Shivanna assumed charge of the Matha.

Social work
The Swami founded a total of 132 institutions for education and training, which range from a nursery school to colleges for engineering, science, arts and management as well as vocational training. He established educational institutions which teach traditional Sanskrit as well as modern science and technology.  The Swami's gurukula houses more than 10,000 children from ages five to sixteen years.  The houses are open to children from all religions, castes, and creeds who are provided free food, education, and shelter (Trividha Daasoha). Pilgrims and visitors to the mutt also receive free meals.  Under the Swami's guidance, an annual agricultural fair was held for the benefit of the local population.

Swami was widely respected for his philanthropic work. The Government of Karnataka announced the institution of Shivakumara Swamiji Prashasti from 2007, the centennial birth anniversary of Swamiji. A. P. J. Abdul Kalam, the former President of India, visited him at Tumkur and praised Swami's humanitarian work and initiatives in education.  Like other Lingayats, Swami adhered to a strict vegetarian diet.

Illness and death
Starting in 2016, Swami was repeatedly hospitalised in Bangalore for various infections, also repeatedly recovering fully after treatment.  The hospitalizations were reported in area newspapers. On 3 January 2019, he was hospitalised again. On 11 January, he was placed on life support as his conditions deteriorated. On 16 January, despite a complete lack of recovery, the Swami was moved back to Siddaganga Matha at his own request. On 21 January, it was reported that he was in a critical condition. He died at 11:44 a.m. local time that day.  The Government of Karnataka declared a public holiday on 22 January as part of the three-day state mourning period in a mark of respect.

Awards and recognitions 
In recognition of his humanitarian work, Karnataka University awarded the Swami an honorary Doctor of Literature by tin 1965. On his centenary in 2007, the Government of Karnataka awarded Swami the Karnataka Ratna, the highest civilian award of the state. In 2015 the Government of India awarded him the Padma Bhushan.

References

External links

 A true Karma Yogi
 Spiritual Holy Place - Sree Siddaganga Mutt

20th-century Hindu religious leaders
21st-century Hindu religious leaders
Lingayatism
Recipients of the Karnataka Ratna
1907 births
2019 deaths
Indian centenarians
Men supercentenarians
People from Tumkur district
Kannada people
Recipients of the Padma Bhushan in other fields
Indian humanitarians